Karavilai is a place in Marthandam in Kanniyakumari district in the Indian state of Tamil Nadu. Karavilai comes under town panchayat of Nallur (Nalloor), Kanyakumari District. The area is full of greenery and there is passage of shallow of water in the region. Soil found around Marthandam is one of the most fertile lands of Tamil Nadu and the region has the climatic conditions of Kerala.

Tamil is the official language of this region however, most of the people understand Malayalam since it is located neighbouring Kerala.

Geography
Area is full of greenery consist of banana, rubber, coconut plantations etc.

Climate

Transport

Roadways
This place has bus services from Marthandam. Road from Karavilai connect with nearby places such as Pallanvilai, Karavilaagam, and Marthandam.

Nearby Bus Stand is the Marthandam New Bus Stand Which is at a distance of 2 km from Karavilai.

Air
The nearest airport is Thiruvananthapuram (Trivandrum) International Airport which is 40 km from Karavilai.

Railways

Kuzhithurai (Marthandam) railway station is situated at a distance of 1.5 km from Karavilai . This railway station collection is more than seven crore per annum and a daily passenger patronage of more than 50,000 people. The station has two platforms and falls on the Kanyakumari—Trivandrum line in the Trivandrum Division of the Southern Railway zone. Most of all daily trains passing through the station halts in Kuzhithurai station.

Daily Passenger trains to Nagercoil, Trivandrum, Kanyakumari, Tirunelveli, Madurai, Kottayam and Kollem.
It has direct trains for Chennai, Madurai, Trivandrum, Bangalore, Jammu, Mumbai C.S.T etc.

Religion

The town has 2 churches. C.S.I Church, Karavilai. and Kirubasanam Church of Christ, Karavilai. TPM Church, Bethel Street, Marthandam; which is 2 km from Karavilai.

Landmarks
 Primary Agriculture Co-operative Credit Society, Karavilai.
 Government Public Library, Karavilai. Government library with good collection of books, magazines and Tamil daily newspapers is available. 
 MARK Cashew Nut Factory, Karavilai.
Govt. Higher Secondary School, Nalloor (Nallur), which is 1 km apart.
 Tip Top Tailors, Karavilai.
 Neduvaali Pond, Karavilai.

Sports
Cricket is the most popular game here. Games such as Volleyball, Kabaddi, Goli also played here.

Photo gallery

See also
 Kuzhithurai Railway Station
 Marthandam
 Nallur, Kanyakumari

References

External links

Official Website of Kanyakumari district
Kuzhithurai Railway Station details

Cities and towns in Kanyakumari district